The women's 3000 metres race of the 2013 World Single Distance Speed Skating Championships was held on 21 March at 17:40 local time.

Results

References

Women 03000
World